Gastón Ezequiel Mansilla (born 30 May 1997) is an Argentine professional footballer who plays as a midfielder for CSD Flandria.

Career
Mansilla played for the Barracas Central academy up until 2017, when the midfielder joined Independiente's youth ranks. In 2018, Mansilla moved to Primera B Metropolitana's Colegiales. He made his professional debut on 21 August versus Acassuso, before scoring his first goal three appearances later against San Miguel in October.

After a spell at Arsenal Sarandí in 2021, Mansilla moved to Flandria in January 2022.

Career statistics
.

References

External links

1997 births
Living people
People from San Martín, Buenos Aires
Argentine footballers
Association football midfielders
Primera B Metropolitana players
Club Atlético Colegiales (Argentina) players
Arsenal de Sarandí footballers
Flandria footballers
Sportspeople from Buenos Aires Province